The Jimmy Carter National Historical Park, located in Plains, Georgia, preserves sites associated with Jimmy Carter (born 1924), 39th president of the United States. These include his residence, boyhood farm, school, and the town railroad depot, which served as his campaign headquarters during the 1976 election.  The building which used to be Plains High School (opened in 1921 and closed in 1979) serves as the park's museum and visitor center. As Carter lives in Plains, the area surrounding the residence is under the protection of the United States Secret Service and is not open to the public.

The Carters returned to Plains in 1981. The former President and First Lady Rosalynn Carter pursue many of the goals of his administration through the Carter Center in Atlanta, which has programs to alleviate human suffering and to promote human rights and world peace. When they are in Plains, Carter teaches Sunday school at Maranatha Baptist Church, which is open to the public.

Visitor center and museum
The former Plains High School, which both Jimmy and Rosalynn Carter attended, now serves as the park's visitor center and museum.  It features a classroom, principal's office, and auditorium which have been restored to look as they would have when Jimmy Carter attended.  An exact replica of the Resolute desk, which Jimmy Carter brought back to the Oval Office to use as his presidential desk, is exhibited, as is his 2002 Nobel Peace Prize.  Other rooms feature exhibits that explain the lives of Jimmy and Rosalynn Carter, and a short video focuses on the life of Jimmy Carter according to his friends, neighbors, and family.

Boyhood home
The farm in rural Archery where Jimmy lived from age four in 1928 until he left for college in 1941 has been restored to its appearance before electricity was installed in 1938.

Campaign headquarters
The former Plains Train Depot, where Carter headquartered his presidential campaign, now serves as a museum focusing on the 1976 Presidential Campaign and Election.  It features exhibits which highlight Jimmy Carter's campaign for President. The train depot operated from 1888 until 1951, when all public transportation to and from the area ceased.

Carter compound

The current home of the Carters, 209 Woodland Drive, while not open to the public, is technically a part of the park.  The Carters have lived in the home since 1961. During his presidency, it was used as his Summer White House.

The Carters intend to be buried in the grounds of the house by a willow tree on the lawn of the property. The intent is for the National Park Service (NPS) to turn the house into a museum and open to public tours after the couple's deaths.

Photos

Plains Train Depot

Visitor Center and Museum

Carter Boyhood Farm

See also
Presidential memorials in the United States

Sources

External links
Official Park Service site
"Life Portrait of Jimmy Carter", from C-SPAN's American Presidents: Life Portraits, broadcast from the Jimmy Carter National Historic Site, December 3, 1999
Jimmy Carter's Boyhood Home
 

National Historical Parks of the United States
Protected areas of Sumter County, Georgia
Presidential homes in the United States
National Historic Site
Historic house museums in Georgia (U.S. state)
Jimmy Carter National Historic Site
Presidential museums in Georgia (U.S. state)
Protected areas established in 1987
1987 establishments in Georgia (U.S. state)
Houses in Sumter County, Georgia
National Register of Historic Places in Sumter County, Georgia